Bluet or bluets may refer to:

 Centaurea, a plant genus in the family Asteraceae
 Several plant genera in the family Rubiaceae, notably:
 Houstonia
 Oldenlandiopsis or "creeping bluet"
 Some damselfly genera in the family Coenagrionidae:
 Enallagma
 Coenagrion
 Bluets (poetry collection), a collection of poetry by Maggie Nelson

See also 
Blewitt (disambiguation)